Oplismenus burmannii (commonly known as Burmann's basketgrass) is a  flowering plant that can be found in Florida and on Hawaii, but is native to Zimbabwe.

Description
Its glumes are of pinkish-red colour and are much longer than the spikelet.

Habitat

References

External links
 

burmannii
Grasses of Africa
Endemic flora of Zimbabwe
Taxa named by Palisot de Beauvois